Hayri Kıvrıkoğlu (born 1948, Konya, Turkey) is a senior officer in the Turkish Army.

Career

In 1969, Kıvrıkoğlu attended the Turkish Military Academy and graduated from the engineering school in 1970.

After several successive promotions he was promoted to brigadier in 1996, joining the 3rd Army Command Operations Staff. He later joined the 8 mechanized Infantry Brigade Command as vice president before being promoted to major general in 2000 and joining the Infantry Division Tactical Command. A position at the 3rd mechanized brigade at Mons Belgium at the National Military Representation Committee before being promoted to lieutenant general in 2006. He served as commander of the 9th Corps Command of the Cyprus Turkish Peace Forces. On 30 August 2008 he was promoted to rank of army general and his appointment as Aegean Army Commander. Currently, he is serving as the commander of the Turkish Land Forces.

Personal life
Kıvrıkoğlu speaks English, is married and has two children. He is related to the former chief of staff, Hüseyin Kıvrıkoğlu.

See also
List of Commanders of the First Army of Turkey

References

1948 births
People from Konya
Turkish Military Academy alumni
Army War College (Turkey) alumni
Turkish Army generals
Living people
Commanders of the Turkish Land Forces